Lower Mesa Falls is a  waterfall on the Henrys Fork in Fremont County, Idaho. It is located in the Caribou-Targhee National Forest on the Mesa Falls Scenic Byway.  It is downstream of Upper Mesa Falls.

See also

 List of waterfalls in Idaho

References

Landforms of Fremont County, Idaho
Waterfalls of Idaho
Cascade waterfalls